Scotland High School is located in Laurinburg, North Carolina. It is a part of the Scotland County Schools district.

Athletics
Scotland is a member of the North Carolina High School Athletic Association (NCHSAA). Their team name is the "Fighting Scots." Recent state championships include the 2006 4A North Carolina baseball championship in Raleigh, NC, and the 2011 4A North Carolina football championship in Winston-Salem, NC. Scotland High School is also known for its kilted marching band.

Notable alumni
Russ Adams, former MLB player for the Toronto Blue Jays
Megan Brigman, former professional soccer player
Rush Brown, former NFL defensive lineman
Brent Butler, former MLB utility infielder
Bucky Covington, country music singer and former American Idol contestant
Lorinza Harrington, former professional basketball player in the NBA
Terrell Manning, former NFL linebacker
Tony McRae, NFL cornerback
Jim Riggs, former NFL tight end
Travian Robertson, former NFL defensive end
Tony Settles, former NFL linebacker; was featured in "The Year of the Scab" documentary by ESPN
Hilee Taylor, former NFL defensive end, played 3 seasons for the Carolina Panthers
Jacoby Watkins, college football coach and former NFL player
Zamir White, NFL running back, CFP National Champion at Georgia

References

External links 
 Scotland High School website
 Scotland County Schools

Public high schools in North Carolina
Schools in Scotland County, North Carolina
1967 establishments in North Carolina
Educational institutions established in 1967